The Soviet Republic of Saxony (German: Sächsische Räterepublik) was a short-lived, unrecognised socialist state during the German Revolution of 1918–19 based in Saxony. Its short history was marred by political strife, violence, and strikes. It ended after the Freikorps took over Leipzig and was restored in 1920, only to be overthrown by the Weimar chancellor in 1923.

Founding
The Soviet Republic of Saxony was proclaimed after the abdication of Frederick Augustus III of Saxony on November 19, 1918. The king's abdication left a power vacuum that USPD and SPD workers' councils soon filled. These councils founded the new state around the cities of Dresden and Leipzig with some influence in the other Saxon states.

The republic, although a Soviet, was not a de facto independent state. The republic did not have a real government. It was de jure led by the leaders of the official Free State of Saxony. In turn, the republic was only able to began collectivization and nationalization efforts without government intervention in the areas the workers' councils controlled. The USPD and SPD constantly conflicted with each other. The leader of the USPD, Richard Lipinski, and the leader of the SPD, Georg Gradnauer were at the front of the division. Throughout the republics short history there was open violence between both parties, and they drifted further apart. In February, after Gradanauer's government was elected, it declared a state of emergency. The USPD in Leipzig refused to allow the government to push for a state of emergency, and troops were brought to Leipzig and destroyed the local councils there. The two parties would continue to fight with each other until the republic had ended.

Labor Unrest and Freikorps Invasion

After the crushing of the Spartacist uprising and the many uprisings in the northwest of Germany, the soviet republic had come into contact with the Soviets in the Russian Soviet Federative Socialist Republic and the Hungarian Soviet Republic. Soon after, in February political violence ramped up and the federal Weimar government stated that a Soviet republic had been proclaimed in Saxony despite no formal declaration. The republic began radicalizing and the intent for an independent republic became known and by March the railways were stopped, and strikes began to break out. After initial strikes broke out, small instances of open conflict broke out, with railways being attacked and further halted in northwestern Saxon cities. Strikes pitched up in coal districts and communication between the Leipzig and Berlin was shattered. The Freikorps turned its increasingly bloody attention to the republic after a small labor rebellion occurred in Leipzig where local workers advocated for a new republic and refused to follow the central government's orders. The Leipzig labor rebellion began to lead the republic towards secession, with ironworkers openly calling for the current non-communist government to be replaced. 
Soon after an attempt to secede, the Freikorps swarmed in and destroyed the uprising. By May 11, 1919, the labor rebellion was crushed and the Soviet Republic of Saxony was dissolved.

Restoration and Second Dissolution
The Soviet Republic of Saxony would return in March, 1920, after it was proclaimed in Eisladen. However, it would only governmentally return when the SPD and KPD in a coalition won the  state election. This state was loyal to the Weimar government and did not attempt to secede like the last republic. The new Soviet would last three years until a crisis broke out within the federal government.

Political violence between Weimar soldiers and workers erupted in the months before the new Soviet government was elected due to the Kapp Putsch in Berlin, the fallout of which radiated all across Germany. On March 17, riots and protests broke out in Dresden, where more than 50 were killed by government forces. In Leipzig, another labor rebellion broke out with open fighting between Weimar troops and the USPD workers of the city. The uprising was calmed by Richard Leipzig, who stopped most of the fighting. Despite this, hardliner communists continued fighting in the city. On March 19, Weimar soldiers burned down the Leipzig House of the People, while suppressing once and for all the hardliner communists. Meanwhile, a radical communist by the name of Max Hoelz put together a Red Army of nearly 200 workers and soldiers patrolled the region of Vogtland. His army was surrounded on the Czech border and captured. The political violence that played out continued for numerous more months until the election.

After the election, the strife did not end there. Bombings by Hoelz across Saxony began and he formed a new Red Army while the federal government secretly undermined Saxony by promoting recruitment to Right-wingers, giving them more of a hold over the country. Assassinations played out, and KPD hardliners stormed certain spots around Saxony, only to be suppressed.

In early October, 1923, a constitutional crisis unfolded in which Gustav Stresemann, chancellor of Germany tried to end the 'radical' rule in Free State of Bavaria, Thuringia and Saxony. After various threats and attacks by KPD members, the Reichswehr believed the KPD were ready to launch a revolution. Weimar troops flooded into Saxony and ended the last Soviet republic. Strikes were called but they failed to accomplish any of their goals. Stresemann's actions only furthered the crisis, and it would see the end of his chancellorship.

See also
Bavarian Soviet Republic
Paris Commune
Spartacist Uprising
Revolutions of 1917-1923

References 

Communism in Germany
Early Soviet republics
Former socialist republics
Former states and territories of Saxony
History of Saxony
German Revolution of 1918–1919
20th century in Saxony